The Riverside School District is a comprehensive community public school district that serves students in pre-kindergarten through twelfth grade from Riverside Township, in Burlington County, New Jersey, United States.

As of the 2019–20 school year, the district, comprised of three schools, had an enrollment of 1,470 students and 108.4 classroom teachers (on an FTE basis), for a student–teacher ratio of 13.6:1.

The district is classified by the New Jersey Department of Education as being in District Factor Group "B", the second lowest of eight groupings. District Factor Groups organize districts statewide to allow comparison by common socioeconomic characteristics of the local districts. From lowest socioeconomic status to highest, the categories are A, B, CD, DE, FG, GH, I and J.

Students from Delanco Township attend Riverside High School as part of a sending/receiving relationship with the Delanco Township School District.

Schools
Schools in the district (with 2019–20 enrollment data from the National Center for Education Statistics) are:
Elementary school
Riverside Township Elementary School with 708 students in grades PreK-5
Scott Shumway, Principal
Middle school
Riverside Township Middle School with 292 students in grades 6-8
Elizabeth Follis, Principal
High school
Riverside Township High School with 423 students in grades 9-12
Todd Pae, Principal

Former schools
 In 1948, during de jure educational segregation in the United States, the district had a school for black children.

Administration
Core members of the district's administration are:
Michael Adams, Superintendent
Robert O'Brien, Business Administrator / Board Secretary

Board of education
The district's board of education, comprised of nine members, sets policy and oversees the fiscal and educational operation of the district through its administration. As a Type II school district, the board's trustees are elected directly by voters to serve three-year terms of office on a staggered basis, with three seats up for election each year held (since 2012) as part of the November general election. The board appoints a superintendent to oversee the day-to-day operation of the district. A tenth member is appointed by Delanco Township to represent its interests on the Riverside Township Board of Education.

References

External links
Riverside School District
 
School Data for the Riverside School District, National Center for Education Statistics

Riverside Township, New Jersey
New Jersey District Factor Group B
School districts in Burlington County, New Jersey